Manoj Badale OBE (born 31 December 1967) is an Indian businessman and venture capitalist. He is the co-founder and managing partner of venture capital firm Blenheim Chalcot, and owner of Indian Premier League franchise Rajasthan Royals.

Life

Badale was born in Dhule Maharashtra India, his primary education was held in Jai Hind High School, Dhule and was educated at the University of Cambridge, where he studied economics. 

In June 2018, Badale was appointed an OBE for services to the economy and charity.

In January 2021, Badale joined the board of Wealdstone FC

IPL Investment and Controversy
In 2008, he along with a consortium of investors, Lachlan Murdoch, Illyria Pty Ltd; and Suresh Chellaram, an independent C.G. investor acquired the Jaipur IPL team 'Rajasthan Royals'. Badale, along with Ranjit Barthakur, soon became the source of controversy when inappropriate and fictitious bids were made, violating BCCI norms. Ranjit Barthakur and Fraser Castellino were the only two shareholders of the Jaipur IPL, completely unknown to the BCCI at the time.

References 

1967 births
Living people
Rajasthani people
Businesspeople from Rajasthan
People from Dhule district
People from Dhule
People from Maharashtra